The Women's Mistral One Design Class was a sailing event on the Sailing at the 2000 Summer Olympics program in Sydney. Eleven races were scheduled and completed. 29 sailors, on 29 sailboards, from 29 nations competed.

Race schedule

Course area and course configuration

Weather conditions

Final results

Daily standings

Further reading

References 

Women's Mistral One Design
Mistral One Design
Olym
Women's events at the 2000 Summer Olympics